There are currently 34 judges (including the Chief Justice) who comprise the Supreme Court of India, the highest court in the country. The maximum possible strength is 34. According to the Constitution of India, the judges of the Supreme Court retire at the age of 65.

In August 2021, then President Ram Nath Kovind signed the warrant of appointments of nine judges, including three women, to the Supreme Court, taking the total number of judges to 33, against the sanctioned strength of 34. It was also the first instance that nine judges to the Supreme Court took oath at once. 7 of the 33 judges (excluding chief justice) are expected to eventually become Chief Justices of India.

Justice Dhananjaya Y. Chandrachud is the 50th and current Chief Justice of India. He was sworn in on 9 November 2022.

List of judges ordered by seniority

Members of Collegium
Currently, the Collegium consists of six members. They are:
Chief Justice Dhananjaya Y. Chandrachud
Justice Sanjay Kishan Kaul
Justice K. M. Joseph
Justice Mukesh Shah
Justice Ajay Rastogi
Justice Sanjiv Khanna

See also

 List of chief justices of India
 List of current Indian chief justices
 List of female judges of the Supreme Court of India
 List of former judges of the Supreme Court of India
List of sitting judges of High Courts of India

References

External links
 List of Judges of the Supreme Court of India

Judges, Sitting
Judiciary of India
Supreme Court of India, Sitting